Elections to Amber Valley Borough Council in Derbyshire, England took place on Thursday 2 May 2019. One third of the council seats were up for election. The Labour Party gained overall control of the council, taking a total of five seats from the Conservatives. In addition, the Green Party gained representation for the first time. After the election, the composition of the council was:-

 Labour 25
 Conservative 18
 Green 1

Election result

Ward results
Percentage change in party votes are from wards contested during the previous election cycle, which was 2015. Percentages might not add up to 100 percent due to rounding.

Alfreton

Alport

Belper Central

Candidate Neil Ploughman was suspended by the Labour Party when alleged anti-Semitic Facebook posts were discovered, however he remained on the ballot. After being elected, he initially sat as an independent on the authority. He was subsequently reinstated by the party with no charge to answer.

Belper East

Belper North

Belper South

Crich

Duffield

Heage and Ambergate

Kilburn, Denby and Holbrook

Ripley

Ripley and Marehay

South West Parishes

Swanwick

Wingfield

References

2019 English local elections
May 2019 events in the United Kingdom
2010s in Derbyshire